The 2003–04 Swiss Super League was the 107th season of top-division football in Switzerland. The competition is officially named AXPO Super League due to sponsoring purposes. It began on 16 July 2003 and has ended on 23 May 2004. This   first season as Swiss Super League.

Overview
It was contested by 10 teams, and FC Basel won the championship.

League standings

Results 
Teams play each other four times in this league. In the first half of the season each team played every other team twice (home and away) and then do the same in the second half of the season.

First half of season

Second half of season

Relegation play-offs

Neuchatel Xamax won 3–2 on aggregate.

Season statistics

Top goalscorers

References

Sources
RSSSF

Swiss Super League seasons
Swiss
1